Marathyssa basalis, the light marathyssa, is a moth in the family Euteliidae. It is found in North America. The species was first described by Francis Walker in 1865.

The MONA or Hodges number for Marathyssa basalis is 8956.

References

Further reading

External links
 

Euteliinae
Articles created by Qbugbot
Moths described in 1865